James Ockenden (July 1885 – 30 November 1949) was an English professional golfer. His best finish in a men's major golf championship was seventh place in the 1914 Open Championship.

Golf career
He was first employed at Epsom Golf Club near his home, before moving to Wembley Golf Club. In 1914 he moved to West Drayton Golf Club but in 1916 he joined up and served in France during World War I. After the war West Drayton was redeveloped and Ockenden moved again to Raynes Park Golf Club.

Prior to the war his best performance was to finish seventh in the 1914 Open Championship. He had some success in the 1920 News of the World Match Play tournament and the following year he was selected for the British team in the International Match at Gleneagles. He won the 1922 Roehampton Tournament and the 1923 Open de France. Following this success he toured America with Arthur Havers from December 1923 to April 1924 during which he was runner-up in the 1924 Texas Open.

In 1925 Raynes Park was also sold for housing and he moved to Hanger Hill Golf Club and then to his final club, North Middlesex Golf Club, in 1928. At North Middlesex he was assisted by his two sons, James and Frederick. His first wife Beatrice died in 1930 and he remarried to Annie in 1933. His son James moved to South Africa in 1934 and was the runner-up at the South African PGA Championship in 1947 and 1948.

Death and legacy
In December James travelled to South Africa to join his son but while there had his leg amputated. He returned to England in November 1949 but died three weeks later. On 3 September 1949 a four-ball match was played at North Middlesex to raise money for Ockenden. Bobby Locke went round in 60, 9-under-par. The match raised about £450.

Tournament wins
1922 Roehampton Tournament
1923 Open de France

Results in major championships

Note: Ockenden only played in The Open Championship.

NT = No tournament
CUT = missed the half-way cut
"T" indicates a tie for a place

Team appearances
Great Britain vs USA (representing Great Britain): 1921 (winners)

References

English male golfers
Sportspeople from Epsom
British military personnel of World War I
Military personnel from Surrey
1885 births
1949 deaths